Mahesh Kumar Chhetri (born 26 January 1988) is a Nepalese cricketer. Mahesh is a right-handed opening batsman and a wicket-keeper. He made his debut for Nepal against Singapore in April 2005.

He represents the Jagdamba Giants of the Nepal Premier League, Nepal Army Club of the National League and Pentagon International College, which plays in the SPA Cup.

Playing career 

Chhetri has played in the U-15 Asia Cup 2002/3, the ACC U-17 cup 2003/4, the ACC Fast Track Countries Tournament 2005, the ACC Under-19 Cup 2005/6, the 2006 ICC Under-19 Cricket World Cup, the 2006 ACC Trophy, the 2007 ACC Under-19 Elite Cup, the 2007 ACC Twenty20 Cup, the 2008 ICC Under-19 Cricket World Cup, 2008 Division Five, 2008 ACC Trophy Elite, 2009 ACC Twenty20 Cup, 2010 Division Five and later in the 2014 World Cup Qualifier.

In the 2015 National One Day Cricket Tournament, he scored 384 runs in 7 innings at an average of 54.86, with three fifties and a century. He was awarded the Player of the Tournament award as his side, Nepal Army Club, won the title. He played for Troon Cricket Club, a cricket club in England, in Cornwall Cricket League Division 2 in July 2015. He scored an unbeaten 64 runs in a match against Gulval Cricket Club and dismissed a batsman by stumping. He was subsequently selected in Nepal's squad for the 2015–17 ICC World Cricket League Championship's matches against Scotland.

References

External links
 Mahesh Chhetri on ESPNcricinfo
 Mahesh Chhetri on CricketArchive
 Mahesh Chhetri's Facebook Profile

Nepalese cricketers
Living people
1988 births
Cricketers at the 2010 Asian Games
Asian Games competitors for Nepal
Wicket-keepers